Mykhailo Mykhailovych Dunets (born 3 November 1950) is a Soviet and Ukrainian former football player and coach.

External links
  Mykhailo Dunets - a manager of Karpaty-2 (Daily Lviv, January 7, 2003)
  Mykhailo Dunets headed of Desna Chernihiv (20minut.ua, February 18, 2009)
  Mykhailo Dunets: "I was informed that I am not a coach any more" (sportanalytic.com, July 20, 2009)
  Mykhailo Dunets: "After Odessa Zhytomyr?" (chernomorets.com, November 14, 1998)
 

1950 births
Living people
Sportspeople from Khmelnytskyi, Ukraine
Soviet footballers
Ukrainian footballers
Association football defenders
FC Vitebsk players
FC Baltika Kaliningrad players
FC Spartak Semey players
Soviet football managers
Ukrainian football managers
Ukrainian Premier League managers
Ukrainian expatriate football managers
Expatriate football managers in Sweden
Expatriate football managers in Moldova
FC Podillya Khmelnytskyi managers
FC Nyva Ternopil managers
FC Komunalnyk Luhansk managers
FC Karpaty-2 Lviv managers
FC Desna Chernihiv managers
NK Veres Rivne managers
FC Polissya Zhytomyr managers
FC Dynamo Khmelnytskyi managers
CSF Bălți managers
FC Krymteplytsia Molodizhne managers